Kvartet I (/i/) is a Russian theater company founded in Moscow in 1993 by a group of graduates from the Russian Academy of Theatre Arts.
Kvartet I also made a few films including Election Day.

The founding members of Kvartet I were: Kamil Larin, Leonid Barats and Aleksandr Demidov.

Filmography
Most movies were directed by Dmitry Dyachenko
 Election Day (2007)
 Radio Day (2008)
 What Men Talk About (2010)
 What Men Still Talk About (2011)
 Faster Than Rabbits (2014)
 Election Day 2 (2016)
 Wonderland (2016)
 What Men Talk About: The Sequel (2018)
 Speakerphone (2019)

References

External links

Theatre companies in Russia